Olesia Karmi (born 23 May 1992) is a Finnish former ice dancer. With partner Max Lindholm, she is the 2015 CS Ice Challenge bronze medalist, 2014 NRW Trophy bronze medalist, and a two-time (2013 and 2015) Finnish national champion. The duo reached the free skate at two ISU Championships – 2013 Europeans in Zagreb and 2015 Europeans in Stockholm. They were 22nd at the 2013 World Championships in London, Ontario.

Karmi and Lindholm ended their partnership in February 2016. They reconsidered a few months later and on 20 April 2016 announced that they would continue competing together.

Programs 
(with Lindholm)

Competitive highlights 
with Lindholm

CS: Challenger Series; JGP: Junior Grand Prix

References

External links 
 

1992 births
Finnish female ice dancers
Living people
Russian emigrants to Finland
Sportspeople from Helsinki
Dancers from Helsinki